J'maine Dale Hopgood (born 11 May 1999) is a professional rugby league footballer who plays as a  for the Parramatta Eels in the NRL.

He previously played for the Penrith Panthers in the National Rugby League.

Early life
Hopgood was born in Hervey Bay, Queensland, and is of Indigenous Australian descent from Gureng Gureng people. He grew up playing for the Hervey Bay Seagulls before moving to Caloundra, Queensland at age 16, where he played for the Caloundra Sharks.

Hopgood's father Dale died of a heart attack on 24 March 2007, aged 39, less than an hour after playing a match for the Seagulls.

Playing career

Early career
In 2017, Hopgood captained Penrith's S. G. Ball Cup (under-18s) squad during his first season at the club. Later that same year, he played for the Queensland under-18s team.

In 2019, Hopgood played for the Queensland under-20s team.

2021
Hopgood was promoted to Penrith's 30-man NRL squad ahead of the 2021 NRL season.

Hopgood made his first grade debut for Penrith in their round 10 match against the Gold Coast on 16 May 2021, as part of the Magic Round. Hopgood's debut was publicly announced on the Tuesday prior, his 22nd birthday.

2022
On 1 June, Hopgood signed a two-year deal to join Parramatta. It was reported that Hopgood had a verbal agreement to join North Queensland for the 2023 NRL season but decided to join the Parramatta club instead.
Hopgood captained Penrith's NSW Cup team to the 2022 premiership defeating Canterbury in the grand final.  Hopgood was also named the 2022 NSW Cup player of the year.
On 2 October, Hopgood scored two tries and was named man of the match in Penrith's 44-10 victory over Norths Devils in the 2022 NRL State Championship final.

2023
Hopgood made his club debut for Parramatta in round 1 of the 2023 NRL season against Melbourne which saw the club lose 16-12 in golden point extra-time.
In round 3 against Manly, Hopgood threw a wild offload in the final five minutes of the match as Parramatta were narrowly behind the scoreboard. The pass was taken by Manly player Haumole Olakau'atu who raced away to score the match winning try. Parramatta would lose the game 34-30.

References

External links
Penrith Panthers profile

1999 births
Living people
Australian rugby league players
Indigenous Australian rugby league players
Rugby league second-rows
Rugby league locks
Penrith Panthers players
Parramatta Eels players
People from Wide Bay–Burnett
Rugby league players from Queensland